Group A of the 2010 Fed Cup Europe/Africa Zone Group II was one of two pools in the Europe/Africa Zone Group II of the 2010 Fed Cup. Four teams competed in a round robin competition, with the top team and the bottom two teams proceeding to their respective sections of the play-offs: the top teams played for advancement to Group I, while the bottom teams faced potential relegation to Group III.

Greece vs. Liechtenstein

South Africa vs. Luxembourg

South Africa vs. Greece

South Africa vs. Liechtenstein

Luxembourg vs. Greece

Luxembourg vs. Liechtenstein

See also
Fed Cup structure

References

External links
 Fed Cup website

2010 Fed Cup Europe/Africa Zone